The Decoration of the Cross of Sanitary Merit was a Decoration established by King Carol I of Romania by Royal Decree 6471 on 25 November 1913 for his wife, Princess Elisabeth of Wied, to award Romanian men, women, and organisations deemed to be working outstandingly to improve the health status of the country.

The Decoration was abolished during the abolishment of the Romanian Monarchy in 1947 and wasn't reinstated as a Dynastic Decoration of the Decorations of the Romanian Royal House by Former King Michael I.

References

Orders, decorations, and medals of Romania